Son of Sisyphus is an album by American jazz trumpeter Bill Dixon recorded in 1988 and released on the Italian Soul Note label.

Reception

In his review for AllMusic, Scott Yanow states: "These lyrical explorations move forward without a pulse and, once one gets used to the "style" (or lack of), they reward repeated listenings."

The authors of The Penguin Guide to Jazz wrote: "Son of Sisyphus... is superior in almost every regard... The overriding impression is of space and movement and there's a sense in which Dixon's melancholically graceful soloing follows Cecil Taylor's much-quoted assertion that his own improvisations imitate the leaps that a dancer makes in space."

Elliott Sharp called the recording "one of [Dixon's] best albums as leader" and included it in his list "Ten Free Jazz Albums to Hear Before You Die".

Track listing
All compositions by Bill Dixon
 "Silences for Jack Moore" - 2:18  
 "Vecctor" - 1:55  
 "Son of Sisyphus" - 7:19  
 "Schema VI-88" - 3:10  
 "Fusama Codex" - 5:23  
 "Mandala per Mandela" - 3:50  
 "Sumi-E" - 2:58  
 "Negoro Codex" - 4:28  
 "Molti Molti Anni Fa..." - 7:40

Personnel
Bill Dixon - trumpet, piano
 John Buckingham - tuba
Mario Pavone - bass
Lawrence Cook - drums

References 

1990 albums
Bill Dixon albums
Black Saint/Soul Note albums